The men's shot put at the 1978 European Athletics Championships was held in Prague, then Czechoslovakia, at Stadion Evžena Rošického on 31 August and 1 September 1978.

Medalists

Results

Final
1 September

† Yevgeniy Mironov  initially won the silver medal with 20.87m, but he was disqualified for drug use.
‡: Geoff Capes was not permitted to start in the final after he was disqualified for "disorderly conduct" for pushing an official during an argument.

Qualification
31 August

†: Yevgeniy Mironov initially reached the final, but he was disqualified for drug use.
‡: Geoff Capes initially reached the final, but he was disqualified for "disorderly conduct" after pushing an official during an argument.

Participation
According to an unofficial count, 19 athletes from 12 countries participated in the event.

 (1)
 (3)
 (3)
 (1)
 (1)
 (2)
 (3)
 (1)
 (1)
 (1)
 (1)
 (1)

References

Shot put
Shot put at the European Athletics Championships